Ribiers is a former commune in the Hautes-Alpes department in southeastern France. On 1 January 2016, it was merged into the new commune Val Buëch-Méouge.

Geography

Climate
Ribiers has a warm-summer mediterranean climate (Köppen climate classification Csb).

Population

See also
Communes of the Hautes-Alpes department

References

Former communes of Hautes-Alpes
Populated places disestablished in 2016